Anthony emeka  (born 10 April 1990) is a Nigerian football player who plays for Chalkida in Gamma Ethniki.

References

External links
 http://www.voetbalnieuws.be/info/spelers/anthony-tochukwu-emeka.html
 http://www.voetbalzone.nl/speler.asp?uid=280761
 

1990 births
Living people
Nigerian footballers
Acharnaikos F.C. players
Association football defenders
Association football midfielders